Hyalorista limasalis is a moth in the family Crambidae. It is found in Honduras.

References

Moths described in 1866
Pyraustinae